This is a partial list of musicians and groups of musicians who have worked in the predominantly Algerian raï genre of music.

Artists

Abdel Ali Slimani
Ahmed Fakroun
Boussouar El Maghnaoui
Boutaiba Sghir
Bouteldja Belkacem
Chaba Fadela
Cheb Bilal
Cheb Hasni
Cheb Kader
Cheb Mami
Cheb Nasro
Cheb Sahraoui
Cheb Tarik
Cheba Zahouania
Cheikha Rabia
Cheikha Rimitti
Fadela & Sahrawi
Faudel
Gana El Maghnaoui
Hamid Bouchnak
Houari Manar
Khaled
Messaoud Bellemou
Mimoun El Oujdi
Najim
Rachid Baba Ahmed
Rachid Taha
Raïna Raï
Reda Taliani

References

Bibliography

 
Rai